Max Oates (19 August 1942 – 28 May 2019) was an Australian rules footballer who played with Footscray in the Victorian Football League (VFL).

Notes

External links 		
		
		

		
1942 births		
2019 deaths		
Australian rules footballers from Victoria (Australia)		
Western Bulldogs players